Ferguson plc (formerly Wolseley plc) is a British-American multinational plumbing and heating products distributor with its head office in Wokingham, England. Its brands include Ferguson Enterprises (in the United States).

Wolseley plc changed its name to Ferguson plc in March 2017, to reflect the primacy of its operations in the United States. Ferguson plc is listed on the London Stock Exchange. The company is registered in Jersey. The company continued to trade as Wolseley in the United Kingdom and Canada, until 2021 when Wolseley UK was sold to a private equity firm.

History

Wolseley
The Wolseley business began in 1887 making sheep shearing machinery. Herbert Austin, who had worked on Wolseley's shearing machinery development in Melbourne, Australia from 1887, when he was aged just 20, was appointed its manager and received a share of its equity.

Seeking other suitable products Austin designed his first car in 1896, and for the next four years, continued to develop and improve his designs. Though the board did allow Austin to purchase some machinery to build cars, they decided around 1900, it was unlikely to be a profitable industry. In 1901, Wolseley's embryo car business was acquired by Vickers, Sons and Maxim.

The postwar rise of synthetic textiles sharply reduced the demand for wool and the necessary machinery, and in 1960, Wolseley diversified activities, by buying Nu Way Heating. Nu Way Burners was founded in 1932 in Vines Lane, Droitwich Spa, Oil Burner Components was founded by Nu Way in 1959, as a national spares organisation. Out of that grew O.B.C. Limited, and then Wolseley Centers Limited, the major distributor of plumbing and central heating equipment.

In 1965, Wolseley purchased Granville Controls and Yorkshire Heating Supplies.

Ferguson
Wolseley continued to expand buying both manufacturing and distribution businesses. In 1982, it entered the market in the United States by acquiring Ferguson Enterprises, a distributor of plumbing supplies, with around fifty branches on the East Coast of the United States. In 1984, some of the manufacturing businesses were sold off, and since that time Wolseley has been mainly a distribution business.

There were further acquisitions in the United Kingdom, the United States and Europe. Wolseley moved into Europe, by buying French plumbing supplies business Brossette in February 1992. Acquisition of many more distribution businesses followed. In April 2000, Wolseley sold most of its remaining manufacturing businesses to Cinven for £215 million.

Wolseley issued a profit warning in July 2008, after the credit crunch, and announced 6,000 job losses. It sold Build Center and Brossete to Saint-Gobain in July 2011, and ISB (Importation et Solution Bois) Group in April 2015. Bois & Matériaux went to OpenGate Capital in November 2015.

Following a 2016 restructuring of the UK business (based in Warwick in Warwickshire), most of the trading brands were renamed, and brought under the single brand of Wolseley. In Scotland, it was a supplier of plumbing, heating and bathroom products, branded William Wilson. In January 2021, Wolseley UK was acquired by Clayton, Dubilier & Rice, for £308 million.

Ferguson plc 
Wolseley announced it would rebrand as Ferguson effective 31 July 2017, because almost all of its business was now in the United States, in the name of Ferguson Enterprises. It continued to use the name Wolseley in the United Kingdom and Canada, for its brand recognition. The stock listing switched to new holding company Ferguson plc on 1 August 2017. In January 2021, Wolseley UK's sale to Clayton, Dubilier & Rice completed Ferguson plc's shift to north America.

The company moved its primary listing to the US and consequently ceased to be a constituent of the FTSE 100 Index on 12 May 2022.

Operations
Ferguson is organised geographically as follows:
United States (trading as Ferguson Enterprises) including Puerto Rico, Mexico and the Caribbean
Canada (trading as Wolseley Canada) and central Europe. In Canada, it is organised into the following businesses: Plumbing, Heating, Ventilating, Air Conditioning and Refrigeration (HVAC/R), Waterworks and Industrial (Pipe, Valves and Fittings).

See also

 Bathstore

References

External links

Wholesalers of the United Kingdom
Companies based in Berkshire
Companies listed on the London Stock Exchange
Business services companies established in 1887
Building materials companies of the United Kingdom